HD 50064 is a blue supergiant located in the constellation of Monoceros, easy to see with small telescopes.

Characteristics

Although it appears quite close to the open cluster NGC 2301 it is much farther away and is not a member of the cluster.  It is at least 2,900 parsecs away, more than twice the distance of NGC 2301.

HD 50064 has variously been assigned spectral types of B6, B9, and B1, and is readily seen to have a bright supergiant luminosity class.  It also shows Hα emission lines with P Cygni profiles, indicating mass loss through a powerful stellar wind.

HD 50064 shows small-amplitude semi-regular pulsations.  One strong period of 37 days has been interpreted as a strange mode oscillation and used to calculate the physical structure of the star.  A luminosity of approximately 1,260,000 times that of the Sun -placing it among the brightest stars of the Milky Way-, a radius 200 times that of the Sun, and a mass 45 times larguer than the Sun, are derived.  The pulsations and its spectrum are similar to those of Luminous blue variables (LBVs).  The moderate mass loss suggests that it is an LBV caught pulsating and creating a circumstellar shell.

References 

B-type supergiants
Luminous blue variables
Monoceros (constellation)
050064
J06513410+0017503
Durchmusterung objects